Alex Shaw (July 8, 1907 – November 29, 2009) was a college men's basketball coach. He was the head coach of the Williams College Ephs from 1950 to 1973. He coached Williams to a 312–171 record, making three NCAA tournament appearances, one Division I appearance (1955) and two Division II appearances (1959 and 1961).  Shaw also served as an assistant football coach at Williams.  He played his college basketball at Michigan.

References

1907 births
2009 deaths
American men's basketball coaches
American centenarians
Men centenarians
Michigan Wolverines men's basketball players
Williams Ephs football coaches
Williams Ephs men's basketball coaches
American men's basketball players
Basketball coaches from Michigan
Basketball players from Detroit